The 1972–73 National Football League was the 42nd staging of the National Football League (NFL), an annual Gaelic football tournament for the Gaelic Athletic Association county teams of Ireland.

Kerry beat Offaly in the final to complete a three-in-a-row, captain Brendan Lynch scoring 2-3.

Format

Divisions
 Division One: 16 teams. Split into two groups of 8.
 Division Two: 16 teams. Split into two groups of 8.

Round-robin format
Each team played every other team in its division (or group where the division is split) once, either home or away.

Points awarded
2 points were awarded for a win and 1 for a draw.

Titles
 Teams in Division One competed for the National Football League title.
 Teams in Division Two competed for the National Football League Division Two title.

Knockout phase structure
In the Semi-Finals, the match-ups were as follows:
 Quarter-final 1: First-placed team in Division One (A) v Second-placed team in Division One (B)
 Quarter-final 2: Second-placed team in Division One (A) v First-placed team in Division One (B)

The final match-up is: Winner Semi-final 1 v Winner Semi-final 2.

Division One

Tables

Group A

Group B

Knockout stage

Division One

Division Two

References

National Football League
National Football League
National Football League (Ireland) seasons